Samir Si Hadj Mohand (born July 16, 1982) is an Algerian football player. He currently plays for CA Bordj Bou Arréridj in the Algerian Ligue Professionnelle 2.

Club career
Si Hadj Mohand began his career in the junior ranks of his hometown club of JSM Béjaïa. During his time with the club, he won the Junior Algerian Cup, for the first time in the club's history.

In 2007, Si Hadj Mohand joined MO Béjaïa, where he played for the next two seasons.

In the summer of 2009, he joined AS Khroub. On August 8, 2009, he made his debut for the club as a starter in a league game against ES Sétif.

References

External links
 DZFoot Profile
 

1982 births
Living people
Footballers from Béjaïa
Kabyle people
Algerian footballers
Algerian Ligue Professionnelle 1 players
AS Khroub players
JSM Béjaïa players
MO Béjaïa players
CA Bordj Bou Arréridj players
Algerian Ligue 2 players
Association football midfielders
21st-century Algerian people